María Cecilia Floriddia (born 16 July 1980 in Rosario) is a female weightlifter from Argentina. She won the bronze medal at the 2007 Pan American Games for her native South American country in the – 58 kg weight division.

References
 the-sports.org

1980 births
Living people
Argentine female weightlifters
Weightlifters at the 2007 Pan American Games
Pan American Games bronze medalists for Argentina
Sportspeople from Rosario, Santa Fe
Pan American Games medalists in weightlifting
Medalists at the 2007 Pan American Games
21st-century Argentine women